Senator Lodge may refer to:

Henry Cabot Lodge Jr. (1902–1985), U.S. Senator from Massachusetts
Henry Cabot Lodge (1850–1924), U.S. Senator from Massachusetts
Patti Anne Lodge (born 1942), Idaho State Senate